Eristena argentata is a moth in the family Crambidae. It was described by Yoshiyasu in 1988. It is found in Japan, where it has been recorded from the Amami Islands.

References

Acentropinae
Moths described in 1988